Rzepa is a Polish surname.

Meaning and origin
The name derives from rzepa, a Polish word meaning turnip.

Notable people
Notable people with this name include:
 Henry Rzepa (born 1950), British chemist
 Miroslaw Rzepa (born 1968), Polish footballer

See also
 Rzepka
 Žepa

References

Polish-language surnames